Hannah McFadden (born January 23, 1996) is an Albanian-American Paralympic sprinter. She is the adopted daughter of Deborah McFadden and the sister of multiple-time Summer Paralympic Games gold medalist Tatyana McFadden.

When she competed with her sister at the 2012 Summer Paralympic Games, it was the first time that two siblings had ever competed together in a Paralympic Games.

References

External links 
 Lieberman, Stuart (October 15, 2015). "Hannah McFadden Is Ready To Make A Name For Herself", Team USA. Retrieved 2018-05-22.
 Armour, Nancy (June 28, 2016). "Hannah McFadden sprints out of sister's shadow", USA Today. Retrieved 2018-05-22.
 
 

1996 births
Living people
Paralympic track and field athletes of the United States
Athletes (track and field) at the 2012 Summer Paralympics
Athletes (track and field) at the 2016 Summer Paralympics
Track and field athletes from Maryland
Medalists at the 2015 Parapan American Games
Medalists at the World Para Athletics Championships
People from Columbia, Maryland
Sportspeople from the Baltimore metropolitan area
Illinois Fighting Illini Paralympic athletes